Salangen is a municipality in Troms og Finnmark county, Norway. The administrative centre of the municipality is the village of Sjøvegan, where most of the people in the municipality live. Other villages include Elvenes, Laberg, and Seljeskog.

The municipality is situated along the Sagfjorden in south central Troms county. The municipality is mostly coastal areas around the fjord as well as some inland valleys. Salangen is home to the world's northernmost bat population.

The  municipality is the 219th largest by area out of the 356 municipalities in Norway. Salangen is the 276th most populous municipality in Norway with a population of 2,087.

General information

The municipality of Salangen was established on 1 January 1871 when it was separated from the large municipality of Ibestad. The initial population of Salangen was 1,384.

During the 1960s, there were many municipal mergers across Norway due to the work of the Schei Committee. On 1 January 1964, the neighboring municipalities of Lavangen (population: 1,677) and Salangen (population: 2,611) were merged to form a new, larger Salangen Municipality with a new population of 4,288.

This merger was not popular and on 1 January 1977, it was mostly undone. Most of the old Lavangen municipality (except for the Lavangsnes area) was separated from Salangen to form a separate municipality once again. After the split, Salangen remained with 2,611 residents.

On 1 January 2020, the municipality became part of the newly formed Troms og Finnmark county. Previously, it had been part of the old Troms county.

Name
The municipality (originally the parish) is named after the local Salangen fjord .

Coat of arms
The coat of arms was granted on 2 December 1985. The official blazon is "Azure, a seal hauriant argent". This means the arms have a blue field (background) and the charge is a seal. The seal has a tincture of argent which means it is commonly colored white, but if it is made out of metal, then silver is used. They are canting arms since the name of the municipality is derived from the old word "Sellanger", meaning "fjord of seals". The arms were designed by Arvid Sveen.

Churches
The Church of Norway has one parish within the municipality of Salangen. It is part of the Indre Troms prosti (deanery) in the Diocese of Nord-Hålogaland.

Geography
The municipality is located in the southern part of Troms county, at the northeastern end of the Astafjorden. The municipality of Ibestad is located west of Salangen, connected by the Mjøsund Bridge; Lavangen municipality to the south; Bardu to the east; and Dyrøy and Sørreisa to the north.

Geology
The area itself is part of the Caledonian Orogeny formed of part of a series of Nappes that run down the coast of Norway. These nappes were metamorphosed as a result of partial subduction beneath Laurentia during the early to middle Paleozoic. On a smaller scale, the municipality is located mainly on quartzite (known as Sjøvegan quartzite locally and regionally as Bø quartzite). In the hills to the south, there is garnet-rich schist (known as Trollvannet schist).

Across the nearby lake Nervatnet and towards the village of Strokkenes, granite within marble is present (Høglund marble and Strokkenes granite). This granite is Leucratic, an indicative sign of granite intruded within an orogenic mountain building event.

Climate

Government
All municipalities in Norway, including Salangen, are responsible for primary education (through 10th grade), outpatient health services, senior citizen services, unemployment and other social services, zoning, economic development, and municipal roads. The municipality is governed by a municipal council of elected representatives, which in turn elect a mayor.  The municipality falls under the Ofoten District Court and the Hålogaland Court of Appeal.

Municipal council
The municipal council  of Salangen is made up of 19 representatives that are elected to four year terms. The party breakdown of the council is as follows:

Mayors
The mayors of Salangen:

1871–1872: Johan Enoksen
1873-1876: Christian Strøm
1877-1880: Samuel Tollefsen
1881-1889: J. B. Markussen
1899-1906: Hans Lund
1907-1934: Kristian Pedersen Tønder (Ap)
1934-1940: Magnus Elvevoll (Ap)
1940-1941: Per Olai Prestbakmo (V)
1946-1963: Johan A Johansen (Ap)
1964-1984: Per Tønder (Ap)
1984-1994: Håkon Bendiktsen (Ap)
1994-1999: Astrid Tunheim (Ap)
1999-2014: Ivar B. Prestbakmo (Sp)
2014-present: Sigrun W. Prestbakmo (Sp)

Notable people 
 Nels Nelsen (1894 in Salangen – 1943), a Canadian ski jumper active from 1916 to 1932
 Dag Tønder (1907 in Salangen – 1989), an editor, lawyer, judge and acting county governor
 Birger Vestermo (born 1930 in Salangen), a cross-country skier, competed at the 1956 Winter Olympics
 Bård Tønder (born 1948 in Salangen), a Norwegian judge; Supreme Court Justice from 2006 to 2018

References

External links
Municipal fact sheet from Statistics Norway 
Salangen municipality - official webpage 

 
Municipalities of Troms og Finnmark
Populated places of Arctic Norway
1871 establishments in Norway